The Band and Corps of Drums of the Royal Gibraltar Regiment is the regimental band of the Royal Gibraltar Regiment of the British Army. The Band usually performs in ceremonial duties in and outside of Gibraltar.

History 
In 1958, the Gibraltar Defence Force became the Gibraltar Regiment under the British Army, serving as the home defence unit of Gibraltar. They became the Royal Gibraltar Regiment in 1999, on the 60th anniversary of their formation. In 1972, the Band and Corps of Drums were established, starting off small. The inspiration behind starting a Band and Corps of Drums came from Major Arthur Ferrary, who took over the regiment in August 1972.

See also 
 British Armed Forces
 Royal Corps of Army Music

References

External links 
Official Website
Website on the British Army Website

Royal Corps of Army Music